Alvin Tresselt (September 30, 1916, Passaic, New Jersey – July 24, 2000) was an American children's book author and graphic designer. His book White Snow, Bright Snow (illustrated by Roger Duvoisin) won the Caldecott Medal. One of his most popular books was his retelling of the Ukrainian folktale The Mitten, illustrated by Yaroslava Mills.

Tresselt grew up in Passaic and graduated from Passaic High School in 1934. He was an editor for Humpty Dumpty Magazine and an executive editor for Parents Magazine Press before becoming an instructor and the Dean of Faculty for the Institute of Children's Literature in Connecticut. He wrote over thirty children's books, selling over a million copies. He died on July 24, 2000, at his home in Burlington, Vermont at the age of 83.

The many collaborations between Tresselt and the illustrator Roger Duvoisin were given the genre title "mood books" when a retrospective of Duvoisin's original art for Tresselt's texts was held at the Zimmerli Art Museum at Rutgers University in 2020. “Mood books were a new type of genre in children’s literature, unlike the typical fantasy and adventure tales,” said Nicole Simpson, the Zimmerli's assistant curator of Prints and Drawings, who organized the exhibition. “These books did not focus on the actions or personalities of iconic characters, but marveled in the natural wonders of our everyday environments. They encourage children to slow down, to observe and appreciate our constantly changing world.”

Works
Rain Drop Splash (1946) – illustrated by Leonard Weisgard, Caldecott Award, Honor 
Sun Up (1949)
Hi, Mister Robin (1950)
Bonnie Bess, the Weathervane Horse (1949), illus. by Erik Blegvad
The Rabbit Story (1957), illus. by Carolyn Ewing
The Smallest Elephant In the World (1959), illus. by Milton Glaser
How Far is Far? (1964), illus. by Ward Brackett
The Mitten (1964), illus. by Yaroslava
The Old Man and the Tiger (1965), illus. by Albert Aquino  
A Thousand Lights and Fireflies (1965), illus. by John Moodie
The World in the Candy Egg (1967) 
Under the Trees and Through the Grass (1967)
The Legend of the Willow Plate (1968)
The Fox Who Traveled (1968), illus. by Nancy Sears
The Little Mouse Who Tarried (1971) by Hirosuke Hamada, English version by Alvin Tresselt, illus. by Kozo Kakimoto
The Dead Tree (1972), illus. by Charles Robinson 
Sun Up (1991, retitled reprint of Wake up, Farm! [1955] with new illus. by Henri Sorensen) 
The Gift of the Tree (1992, retitled reprint of The Dead Tree [1972] with new illus. by Henri Sorensen)

Works illustrated by Roger Duvoisin
White Snow, Bright Snow (1947) – Caldecott Award
Johnny Maple-Leaf (1948)
Follow the Wind (1950)
Autumn Harvest (1951)
Follow the Road (1953)
Wake up, Farm! (1955)  
Wake up, City! (1957)
The Frog in the Well (1958)
Under the Trees and Through the Grass (1962) 
Hi, Mister Robin! (1963, new edition from 1950 version)
Hide and Seek Fog (1965) – Caldecott Award, Honor
Timothy Robbins Climbs the Mountain (1967)
It’s Time Now (1969) 
The Beaver Pond (1971)
What Did You Leave Behind? (1978)

References

External links

 
 World Cat Identities

1916 births
2000 deaths
Passaic High School alumni
Writers from Passaic, New Jersey
American children's writers